Lambreva Beach is the mostly ice-free 1.3 km long beach on the northwest coast of Nelson Island in the South Shetland Islands, Antarctica, extending southwest of Smilets Point and northeast of Sabin Point. Its surface area is 17 ha. The area was visited by early 19th century sealers.

The beach is named after Anka Lambreva (1895-1976), nurse, writer and lecturer, the first Bulgarian woman who circumnavigated the globe.

Location
British mapping of the area in 1968.

Maps
 Livingston Island to King George Island. Scale 1:200000. Admiralty Nautical Chart 1776. Taunton: UK Hydrographic Office, 1968
 South Shetland Islands. Scale 1:200000 topographic map No. 3373. DOS 610 - W 62 58. Tolworth, UK, 1968
 Antarctic Digital Database (ADD). Scale 1:250000 topographic map of Antarctica. Scientific Committee on Antarctic Research (SCAR). Since 1993, regularly upgraded and updated

Notes

References
 Bulgarian Antarctic Gazetteer. Antarctic Place-names Commission. (details in Bulgarian, basic data in English)

External links
 Lambreva Beach. Adjusted Copernix satellite image

Beaches of the South Shetland Islands
Bulgaria and the Antarctic